Wajed Hossain Tarafdar is a Bangladesh Nationalist Party politician and the former Member of Parliament of Bogra-6.

Career
Tarafdar was elected to parliament from Bogra-6 as a Bangladesh Nationalist Party candidate in 1979.

References

Bangladesh Nationalist Party politicians
Living people
2nd Jatiya Sangsad members
Year of birth missing (living people)